Kerry James Evans (born 1983) is an American poet. He  holds a PhD in English from Florida State University and an MFA in creative writing from Southern Illinois University-Carbondale. He lives in Tallahassee with his wife.

Evans’ debut book, Bangalore, was published in 2013 by Copper Canyon Press and was a 2013 Lannan Literary Selection. He was also profiled in The New York Times in 2013.

References

American male poets
1983 births
Living people
Florida State University alumni
Southern Illinois University Carbondale alumni
21st-century American poets
21st-century American male writers